East Timor competed at the 2018 Winter Olympics in Pyeongchang, South Korea, from 9 to 25 February 2018, returning to the winter games after their debut in 2014. The Timor-Leste team consisted of one male alpine skier.

Competitors
The following is the list of number of competitors participating in the delegation per sport.

Alpine skiing 

Timor-Leste qualified one male athlete, Yohan Goutt Gonçalves, who also competed for the country in 2014.

See also
Timor-Leste at the 2017 Asian Winter Games

References

Nations at the 2018 Winter Olympics
2018
Winter Olympics